Chlorencoelia is a species of fungus in the family Hemiphacidiaceae. It was originally described in 1798 by Christian Hendrik Persoon as Peziza versiformis. The species was transferred to Chlorencoelia in 1975.

References

External links

Fungi described in 1798
Helotiales
Taxa named by Christiaan Hendrik Persoon